Galina Yakovlevna Minaicheva (born 17 October 1929) was a Russian artistic gymnast. She competed at the 1952 Summer Olympics, finishing within the first 10 in all artistic gymnastics events, and winning one gold, one silver and one bronze medal.

Minaicheva married a Georgian man and moved to Tbilisi, changing her last name to Sharabidze. Under this name she won a team gold medal at the 1954 World Artistic Gymnastics Championships. In 1957 she graduated from the Institute of Physical Education in Tbilisi and worked as a gymnastics coach.

References

External links
Biography of Galina Minaicheva 

1929 births
Living people
Sportspeople from Moscow
Gymnasts at the 1952 Summer Olympics
Olympic gymnasts of the Soviet Union
Olympic gold medalists for the Soviet Union
Olympic silver medalists for the Soviet Union
Olympic bronze medalists for the Soviet Union
Olympic medalists in gymnastics
Soviet female artistic gymnasts
Medalists at the 1952 Summer Olympics
Medalists at the World Artistic Gymnastics Championships